HMS Intrepid (L11) was one of two  amphibious warfare ships of the Royal Navy. A landing platform dock (LPD), she served from 1967 until 1999. Based in HM Naval Base, Devonport, Plymouth, Devon and HM Naval Base Portsmouth, she saw service around the world over her 32-year life.

At one point slated for decommissioning under terms of the 1981 Defence White Paper, she was rapidly returned to service to sail as part of the British operation to retake the Falkland Islands after the Argentine invasion in 1982. She landed troops in amphibious assaults on the Islands and the Argentine surrender was signed on her deck at the conclusion of the Falklands War.

Role

The landing platform docks (LPDs) provided support to a Royal Marines amphibious assault force and provided a platform for the Headquarters capability prior to, and during, the assault phase.

Service

Intrepid was the second of her class of purpose built LPDs used by Royal Navy. She was built in Clydebank, West Dunbartonshire, at the John Brown & Company yard and was launched in 1964 before undergoing trials and commissioning in 1967. She was the last ship built by John Brown & Co for the Royal Navy.

The LPDs were intended to provide both a heavy lift for amphibious operations and to support a one star (Brigade) Headquarters afloat. As originally designed they could carry a load of fifteen main battle tanks (MBTs), five self-propelled guns, eight recovery and engineer vehicles, six 3-ton trucks with trailers and twenty-eight Landrovers and trailers, in essence an Armoured Battle Group, or any equivalent load. Accommodation was also provided for up to 450 troops.  The ships were equipped with an extensive array of communications equipment and an Amphibious Operations Room (AOR) linked to the Main Communications Office (MCO) and adjacent to the ships own Operations Room on 03 deck. The AOR was used by the Brigade Headquarters until it moved ashore. In addition to HQ 3 Commando Brigade, it could also be used by the army Brigade designated for amphibious operations. In the early 1970s this was Headquarters 24 (Airportable) Brigade based at Plymouth.

To support these roles, part of the original ship's complement included two army units, 661 Signal Troop and 506 Operating Troop RCT. The Signal Troop lived and worked with the ship's Communications Division whereas the Operating Troop, which included RCT stevedores, a Royal Engineers beach section and a REME recovery crew equipped with a Centurion Beach Armoureed Recovery Vehicle (BARV), worked as part of the Royal Marines Beach Unit. However, in the early 1970s the decision by the Royal Navy to re-role the LPDs, in rotation, as the Dartmouth Training Ship significantly reduced their availability for amphibious operations and training. The army subsequently decided to disband both units and this took place on 3 December 1973 at Devonport. Subsequently both roles were taken over by the Royal Marines.

In November 1967, Intrepid formed part of a naval task force deployed to cover the British Withdrawal from Aden. On 29 March 1968, Intrepid and the frigate  were deployed to patrol off the Greater and Lesser Tunbs, small islands in the Persian Gulf, to deter Iran from occupying the islands. Intrepid became the first Royal Navy warship equipped with satellite communication equipment in 1969.

Intrepid was the command and control ship for major disaster relief operation in East Pakistan in November 1970. The 1970 Bhola cyclone was a devastating tropical cyclone that struck East Pakistan (present-day Bangladesh) and India's West Bengal on 3 November 1970. It remains the deadliest tropical cyclone ever recorded and one of the deadliest natural disasters. Melting snow from the Himalayas met the storm surge that flooded much of the low-lying islands of the Ganges Delta. Intrepid with HMS Triumph left Singapore for the Bay of Bengal to assist with the relief efforts. Force controlled twenty helicopters, eight landing craft, 650 troops, and assisted international and civilian rescue teams distributing supplies. At least 500,000 people lost their lives in the storm. Sailors and Soldiers had to help bury the dead. A hard duty for which Navy Rum, a 200-year tradition which had recently ceased, had to be re-instated.

As a result of defence cuts, Intrepid went into reserve in 1976, being brought back into active service in 1979 to allow Fearless to be refitted.

It was announced in 1981 that the two LPDs were to be deleted, though that decision was reversed just weeks prior to the outbreak of the Falklands War. Intrepid was rapidly brought back into commission, with her ship's company recalled by Commander Bryn Telfer (the Executive Officer), and Malcolm MacLeod, the crew gladly returned to form part of the task group committed to Operation Corporate, the British effort to recapture the islands. Intrepid was commanded by Captain Peter Dingemans.

With elements of 3 Commando Brigade embarked, Intrepid took part in the amphibious landings at San Carlos Water. Intrepid was under attack in San Carlos Water on 25 May 1982, with a few fatalities, mainly Royal Marines.  She came under heavy air attack once again during the operation, and was the main participant in the landings at Bluff Cove on 6 June. Margaret Thatcher and Sandy Woodward commended the efforts of the ships involved in the San Carlos attacks.

The Intrepid would be the last ship to arrive, the last piece in the jigsaw, and so all the timings depended on her.

As well as being one of the warships used for imprisoning the Argentine prisoners of war, the surrender ending the Falklands conflict was signed on Intrepids deck.

Intrepid was refitted at Devonport Royal Dockyard between January 1984 and June 1985, with two Sea Cat launchers removed, with twin 30 mm anti-aircraft mounts and two single 20 mm cannon added. From June 1985 until 1990 she supported the sea training phase of initial officer training, undertaken at Britannia Royal Naval College, as part of the Dartmouth Training Squadron. During the same period Intrepid also provided Marine Engineering Artificer Apprentices from HMS Sultan their sea training opportunity. During a three to four-month period, each entry of Artificers would spend a week working in each department aboard in order to learn more about the other trades in the Royal Navy.

Decommissioned
Intrepid was placed in reserve status late in 1990, when Fearless completed an extensive refit. Intrepid was in poor physical condition by this time, which prevented a similar upgrade, and was laid up at HM Naval Base Portsmouth. Intrepid was used as a source of spares for Fearless. She was decommissioned in 1999 and awaited her disposal, by scrapping, in Fareham Creek, Hampshire.

On 12 February 2007, the MoD announced that Intrepid was to be recycled at a British facility. Leavesley International was selected as the preferred bidder, pending licence acquisition.
The contract aimed to ensure that the ship was disposed of responsibly, and in full compliance with international environmental legislation.

Having received the required planning permission and environmental licences for disposal, Intrepid left Portsmouth for her final journey to Liverpool on 13 September 2008. Having been previously suggested as potential diving site on the south coast, various veterans of the Falklands War started a petition on the 10 Downing Street website to preserve the ship as a memorial to the conflict.

Replacement LPDs were ordered during the 1990s with  being commissioned in 2003.

References

Notes

Bibliography
 Baker, A.D. The Naval Institute Guide to Combat Fleets of the World 1998–1999. Annapolis, Maryland, USA: Naval Institute Press,1998. .
 Blackman, Raymond V.B. Jane's Fighting Ships 1971–72. London: Sampson Low, Marston & Co., Ltd., 1971. .
 Clapp, Michael and Ewen Southby-Tailyour. Amphibious Assault Falklands. London (1996). .
 Gardiner, Roger and Stephen Chumbley. Conway's All The World's Fighting Ships 1947–1995. Annapolis, Maryland, USA: Naval Institute Press, 1995. .
 Dingemans, Rear Admiral Peter. My Incredible Journey From Cadet to Command. Redditch (2016). Brewin Books Ltd. .
 Moore, John. Jane's Fighting Ships 1985–86. London: Jane's Yearbooks, 1985. .
 Prézelin, Bernard and A.D. Baker. The Naval Institute Guide to Combat Fleets of the World 1990/1991. Annapolis, Maryland, USA: Naval Institute Press, 1990. .
 Roberts, John. Safeguarding the Nation: The Story of the Modern Royal Navy. Annapolis, Maryland, USA:  Naval Institute Press, 2009.

External links

 HMSIntrepid.com
 Crew Manning And Operation

 

Fearless-class landing platform docks
Cold War amphibious warfare vessels of the United Kingdom
Ships built on the River Clyde
Falklands War naval ships of the United Kingdom
1964 ships